Nelson Tennant (9 February 1923 - August 2006) was an English former professional rugby league footballer who played in the 1940s.

Playing career

Tennant made his début for Featherstone Rovers and scored a try against Huddersfield at Fartown Ground on Tuesday 26 March 1940. He made a WW2 guest appearance for St Helens on 15 Nov 1941, when Saints were short of players.

Genealogical information
Nelson Tennant is the son of the rugby league footballer; Buff Lord, and the younger brother of Margaret Tennant (birth registered during first ¼ 1919 in Pontefract district), the rugby league footballer; Walter Tennant, and the older brother of Alice Tennant (birth registered during second ¼ 1925 in Pontefract district), Maurice Tennant (birth registered during second ¼ 1928 in Pontefract district - death registered during second ¼ 1929 (aged-1) in Pontefract district), and the rugby league footballer; Alan Tennant. Nelson Tennant is the uncle of Walter Tennant's son, the rugby league footballer; Clive Tennant.

References

External links

Search for "Tennant" at rugbyleagueproject.org
Walter Tennant, Alan Tennant, Nelson Tennant and Clive Tennant

1923 births
2006 deaths
English rugby league players
Featherstone Rovers players
Rugby league halfbacks
Rugby league players from Pontefract
St Helens R.F.C. players